is a Japanese former voice actor who worked for 81 Produce.

On October 1, 2019, Tsukui revealed that he has been diagnosed with ALS and has been using a cane and wheelchair to help with his mobility. On February 17, 2023, Tsukui revealed that he has lost his voice and has retired from voice acting as a result. He is also no longer able to use his arms or legs and only communicates through digital software.

Filmography

Anime
Chibi Maruko-chan (1990), Shinji Sekiguchi, Mamoru Kawada, Yamane's Father, Alien
Dororonpa! (1991), Takashi
Mobile Fighter G Gundam (1994), Michelo Chariot
Azuki-chan (1995), Makoto Sakaguchi
Neighborhood Story (1995), Jiro Nishino
Detective Conan (1996), Naoya Nishitani
You're Under Arrest (1996), Daisuke
Tekken: The Motion Picture (1998; Film), Baek Doo San
Bubu Chacha (1999), Mary's Father, Bobby
Dr. Slump (1999), Majito
Ojamajo Doremi (1999), Kouji Senoo
Digimon Tamers: The Adventurer's Battle (2001; Film), Labramon and Shisamon
s-CRY-ed (2001), Straight Cougar
Rozen Maiden (2004), Detective Kun-kun and Laplace's Demon
He Is My Master (2005), Pochi
Black Blood Brothers (2006), Johan Tsang
Zombie-Loan (2007), Hakka
The Idolmaster (2011), Program Director
Hunter × Hunter (Second Series) (2013), Baro, Bihorn, Flutter
Fantasista Doll (2013), Rinto Mikasa
Wish Upon the Pleiades (2015), Nanako's father

Tokusatsu
Ninja Sentai Kakuranger (1994), Yokai
Chouriki Sentai Ohranger (1995), Bara Cactus 2 (ep. 5)
Gekisou Sentai Carranger (1996), Deputy Leader Zelmoda
Seijuu Sentai Gingaman (1998), Chainzaws (ep. 45)
Kyuukyuu Sentai GoGo-V (1999), Fighting Psyma Beast Spartan (ep. 36)
Hyakujuu Sentai Gaoranger (2001), Cellphone Org (ep. 9)
Bakuryuu Sentai Abaranger (2003), Trinoid 12: Yatsudenwani (eps. 18 - 50)
Tokusou Sentai Dekaranger (2004), Wandean Niwande (ep. 27)
GoGo Sentai Boukenger (2006), Tsukumogami Kanadegami (ep. 12)
Kamen Rider Den-O (2007), Crust Imagin (ep. 5 - 6)
Juuken Sentai Gekiranger (2007), Mythical Beast Afanc-Fist Sojo (ep. 41 - 42)
Engine Sentai Go-Onger (2008), Engine Carrigator (eps. 7 - 47, 50)
Engine Sentai Go-onger: Boom Boom! Bang Bang! GekijōBang!! (2008), Carrigator
Engine Sentai Go-onger vs. Gekiranger (2009), Carrigator
Samurai Sentai Shinkenger vs. Go-onger: GinmakuBang!! (2010), Carrigator
Tensou Sentai Goseiger (2010), Namono-Gatari of Orthturos Headder (Gatari (Namono Voice by Takahiro Imamura)) (ep. 46)
Kaizoku Sentai Gokaiger vs. Space Sheriff Gavan: The Movie (2012), Trinoid 12: Yatsudenwani
Tokumei Sentai Go-Busters (2012), Keshigomuloid (ep. 26)
Tokumei Sentai Go-Busters vs. Kaizoku Sentai Gokaiger: The Movie (2013), Trinoid 12: Yatsudenwani
Ressha Sentai ToQger Vs. Kamen Rider Gaim Spring Vacation Combining Special (2014), Moguraroid
Uchu Sentai Kyuranger (2017), Goneshi (ep. 15, 25)

Video games
Psychic Force (1995), Gates Oltman, Keith Evans
Gunbird 2 (1998), Pom-Pom
GA Geijutsuka Art Design Class (2010), Takuma Sotoma
Everybody's Golf 6 (2011), Edge

Dubbing roles

Live-action
Broken Arrow, Giles Prentice (Frank Whaley)

Animation
Cars 2, Acer
Mutant Turtles: Superman Legend, Bebop
Inspector Gadget
Thomas the Tank Engine & Friends, Donald and Douglas (Season 11 onwards succeeding Hiroyuki Satō and Takeshi Endo)

References

External links
Kyousei Island (Japanese)
 
Ryu's Seiyuu Infos

1961 births
People with motor neuron disease
81 Produce voice actors
Living people
Japanese male video game actors
Japanese male voice actors
Male actors from Tokyo
20th-century Japanese male actors
21st-century Japanese male actors